Estevão de Brito, S.J. (1567–1641), in Latin Stephanus de Britto, was a Portuguese Jesuit and Roman Catholic prelate who served as Archbishop of Cranganore (1624–1641) and Titular Bishop of Salona (1621–1624).

Biography
Estevão de Brito was born in Estremoz, Portugal in 1567 and professed a priest in the Society of Jesus in 1603.
On 11 January 1621, he was appointed during the papacy of Pope Paul V as Titular Bishop of Salona and Coadjutor Archbishop of Cranganore.
Om 18 February 1624, he succeeded to the bishopric.
On 29 September 1624, he was consecrated bishop by Sebastião de São Pedro, Bishop of Cochin. 
He served as Archbishop of Cranganore until his death on 2 December 1641.

References

External links and additional sources
 (for Chronology of Bishops) 
 (for Chronology of Bishops) 

17th-century Roman Catholic archbishops in India
Bishops appointed by Pope Paul V
1567 births
People from Estremoz
1641 deaths
Jesuit bishops
17th-century Portuguese Jesuits